The AES Corporation is an American utility and power generation company. It owns and operates power plants, which it uses to generate and sell electricity to end users and intermediaries like utilities and industrial facilities. AES is headquartered in Arlington, Virginia, and is one of the world's leading power companies, generating and distributing electric power in 15 countries and employing 10,500 people worldwide. AES Corporation is a global Fortune 500 power company. AES Ranks in the Top Ten of Fast Company's 2022 Best Workplaces for Innovators.

History 

The company was founded on January 28, 1981, as Applied Energy Services by Roger Sant and Dennis Bakke, two appointees of the Federal Energy Administration under president Richard Nixon. The company was initially a consulting firm; it became AES Corporation, which went public in 1991. Sant was chairman, CEO, and president and Bakke was executive vice president until assuming the position of president in 1987. Bakke would later become the company's CEO in 1994, serving for 8 years until his resignation in 2002, in the midst of a liquidity crisis that followed the collapse of the energy giant Enron. Sant remained as executive chairman until 2003 and as a member of the board until 2006. Paul Hanrahan was appointed President and CEO and served for 10 years, overseeing the stabilization of the company. Until the early 2000’s, the company followed self-management, delegating much responsibility to ordinary employees. In 2012, Hanrahan resigned, his position as President and CEO of the company succeeded by Andres Gluski. As CEO, Gluski has implemented a strategy of reducing the number of countries in which AES does business, from 28 to 16, for the purpose of consolidating operations and reducing costs. Additionally, he also began a program of reducing the company's total carbon emission intensity.

Bakke and Sant oversaw much of AES's initial global expansion, building power plants in 29 countries and expanding its staff from 1,400 to 32,000 employees, and also instilled a system of decentralized management that emphasized social responsibility above profit. In recent years, AES has also signaled a commitment to providing its consumers and clients with renewable forms of energy, and their operations across the world have increasingly focused on the construction and provision of solar and wind-based energy storage systems.

AES acquired the assets of Indianapolis Power & Light, Ipalco, in 2000. In February, 2021, Indianapolis Power & Light rebranded as AES Indiana.

AES acquired the Chilean-based subsidiary Gener in 2000. 
AES acquired DPL Inc., then known as Dayton Power & Light, in 2011. The company was rebranded as AES Ohio in February, 2021.

In fiscal 2015 AES's total revenue was $15 billion.

In 2018, AES acquired the subsidiary sPower.

In December, 2021, AES acquired Community Energy Solar (Community Energy) to help deliver 4 GW of renewables in the US.

Major projects

Fluence
Launched during January 2018, Fluence is a joint venture between AES Energy Storage and Siemens that is focused on the development of, and expansion of energy storage technologies and services. Chaired by former AES vice-president for energy storage platforms Stephen Coughlin, and headquartered in Washington D.C., Fluence aims to implement AES's extensive research into the potential of lithium-ion powered energy sources by relying upon Siemens' expansive global presence in the industrial sector; for the purpose of addressing the rapidly rising demand for clean energy technologies. Fluence has been deployed in 16 countries, with major projects including the following:

 The creation of a new 40 megawatt storage facility on behalf of San Diego Gas & Electric's new 40 MW storage facility.
 Three solar powered projects throughout Arizona and two 10 MW projects in the Dominican Republic.
 The installation of six storage projects across Germany that will provide grid stabilization.
 The construction of a hybrid microgrid on the Mediterranean Island of Ventotene. Said microgrid will be developed as per an agreement between Fluence and the Italian energy utility Enel, and will combine diesel generators with renewables in order to aid in the efforts to reduce carbon costs and emissions. The key technology platforms developed by Fluence include the following.

Key Fluence technologies

Fluence is expected to employ three different types of grid technology. WP:Crystal

i):SIESTORAGE: An electrical energy storage system fueled predominantly by wind and solar energy. Siestorage relies upon the closed-loop controls and pulse modulation built into its semiconductors, in order to provide consumers with increased dependability.

ii):Advancion: A storage system that is made up of several small, modular nodes and powered by Lithium ion batteries, which enables the Advancion energy store system to provide consumers with a heightened degree of consistency in performance.

iii): Sunflux Energy: Announced in January 2018, Sunflex was developed for the purpose of expanding upon the possibilities offered by photovoltaic solar energy. This technology is built to capture energy during peak solar hours in order to expand energy delivery.

Projected ventures using Fluence technologies
Presently, the biggest project in Fluence's portfolio is a 100–400 Mwh "power center energy storage project" for Southern California Edison. This system will be housed within AES's power center in Los Alamitos, California.

During January 2018, the subsidiary AES India, working in partnership with Mitsubishi, commenced construction of a 10 MW energy storage solution that will be located in Rohini. This storage solution, which shall operate off Fluence's Advancion technology, is projected to be the first utility-scale system to be in India.

sPower
Headquartered in Salt Lake City and acquired from Fir Tree Partners Inc in a purchase during 2017, as part of a joint acquisition with Alberta Investment Management Corporation. Spower is one of the largest operators and developers of utility-scale solar in the United States; operating across 11 states, and with particular focus on the states of California and North Carolina. Spower's current operating portfolio includes 1.3 GW worth of solar and wind based properties, in addition to over 10,000 MW worth of projects that are in the developmental stage.

Investment in drone technologies
As part of an effort by AES to protect its employees from industry hazards and to improve workplace safety, the company announced a partnership with a drone provider, Measure, to inspect their various energy infrastructures sites across 17 countries.

Major properties and subsidiaries

Properties and subsidiaries in North America
 AES Ohio, formerly DPL Inc. – Dayton Power and Light Company
 AES Indiana, formerly IPL – Indianapolis Power & Light Company
 Premier Power 
 AES Energy Storage. AES Energy Storage has provided some of the largest battery storage power station in the world.
AES Puerto Rico
AES Colón power station, Panama

Properties in South America

Based in Argentina
 TermoAndes: Located in the province of Salta, and acquired by AES in 2000. This hybrid plants utilizes both gasoline and diesel fuels and has a MW capacity of 643.
 Alicura: Acquired by AES in the year 2000. This hydro powered plant is one of Andes' most important alternative energy assets, boasting 1,000 megawatts of generation.
 Ullum: Acquired in 1996, this plant generates 45 megawatts of electricity via hydropower.
 Guillermo Brown: Located in the province of Buenos Aires, and acquired by AES in 2016. This gas turbine utilizes both natural gas and diesel fuels and has a megawatt capacity of 576.
 Los Caracoles: Owned by AES Argentina, and located in [Buenos Aires]. This hydroelectric plant produces 12 MW. Although AES owns the property, the equity is publicly owned, and operations are carried out through various managerial and Observation and Measurement agreements.
 Paraná-GT: Purchased by AES Argentina in 2001, and located in San Nicolás. This plant uses both gasoline and diesel as fuel sources, and has a total capacity of 845 megawatts.
 Carba Corral: Based in the province of [Salta], and owned by AES Argentina, who purchased the property in 1995. This plant has an installed megawatt capacity of 102, and runs on hydro power.
 Sarmiento Power Plant: Owned by AES Andes, and located in San Juan Province, Argentina. This plant was acquired by AES in 1996, and runs off both gas and diesel fuel. It has an installed capacity of 33 MW, and runs off 3 Electrical gas turbines, all of which measure 11 MW.

Based in Brazil
 AES Brazil: Founded in 1997. Ownership is divided between AES and the Brazilian Development Bank.
 
 AES Tietê – Brazil

Based in Chile 
 AES Andes

Properties and subsidiaries in Europe

Based in United Kingdom
 Ballyumford Power Station: Located on the northwestern end of Islandmagee in County Antrim. This property, purchased by AES in 2010, is the largest power station on the Irish mainland, boasting a generating capacity of 1017 megawatts. 
 Kilroot Power Station: Acquired by AES in 1992 deal that included Belfast Power Station West. The company was named NIGEN and distinguished by the fact that it was the first purchase the company made outside of the United States, this property is located on the north shore of Belfast Lough in, and was acquired by AES in 1992. This station has an installed generating capacity of 560 megawatts, and operates using generators that run off both oil and gas, as well as via turbines that provide it with an additional 142 MW. Belfast Power Station West was a 240MW coal fired plant comprising 13 chain grate stoker boilers and 5 Parsons turbo generators 2X30MW and 3x60MW
 Array: An energy storage system located at the Kilroot Power station, and operating off Fluence's Advancion model. This system is the largest advanced energy storage system in the United Kingdom, providing 10 megawatts of interconnected storage energy.

Based in Bulgaria
 Maritiza Iztok: The largest energy complex in Southeast Europe, the Maritiza Iztok Complex is a 690  coal plant located in Galabovo. It was acquired by AES in 2011.
 St. Nikola: St. Nikola is a 156 MW wind generator located near the town of Kavarna. It was built in 2009 and is considered the largest wind farm in the country. As part of the high efficiency standards maintained throughout the development and construction of this generator, AES Geo Energy was awarded both the 2008 "Sustainable Energy Deal of the Year" Prize from EMEA Finance Magazine, as well as the "Investor of 2009" in the Energy Sector by the Bulgarian Investment Agency for Production of Electric Power from RES.).

Based in the Netherlands    
 Eltsa: Located in the Dutch province of Zeeland, near Terneuzen. AES acquired 50% of the interests in this facility in 1998, as part of a transaction that divided ownership between it, DELTA, and Essent. This facility is powered by a trio of natural gas turbines, and can produce up to 630 MW of power.
 Netherlands ES: Located in Amsterdam, this energy storage system was built using AES's Advancion technology. This system, which produces a total of 10 MW, is designed to provide a low-battery based alternative to traditional power plants and hydroelectric storages.

Properties and subsidiaries in Asia

Properties and subsidiaries in the Middle East

Based in Jordan
 'The Amman East Power Plant' MW  a 380 MW combined cycle gas-fired power plant located Al Manakher. The plant was commissioned in 2009, and is a shared subsidiary of AES and Mitsui & Co. In 2011 Qatar Electricity & Water Corporation announced it will buy a stake in the power plant.

Properties and subsidiaries in Central Asia

Based in Kazakhstan
 Ust-Kamenorgorsk: Active since 1947 and purchased megawatt AES in 1997, CHP is a 1,372 MW coal power plant located in the East Kazakhstan Region.
 The Shulbinsk: Acquired by AES in 1997, Shulbinsk is a 702 MW plant that runs off Hydroelectricity. It is located in Semey.
 Ust- Kamenogorsk HPP: Located on the Irtysch River near Ust-Kamengorsk in the East Kazakhstan Region, and purchased by AES in 1997. This is a hydroelectric plant that operates using 4 individual turbines, which give it a nominal output of 83 megawatts, and a total generation capacity of 340 megawatts.
 Sogrinsk CHP: Acquired by AES in 1997 and operated by the power generation company CHP LLP, this coal based plant has a total capacity of 345 MW. It is located in the East Kazakhstan Region.

Properties and subsidiaries in Southeast Asia

Based in the Philippines
 Masinloc Power Plant: Located in the Zambales Province in Luzon, and purchased for a sum of $930 million from Masinloc Power Partners Co. Ltd. in 2009. This project, a 630 MW coal power plant, derives its resources from its proximity to the Pacific Rim, and has a stable infrastructure amendable to further megawatt additions.
 Masinloc ES: Located in the Zambales Province in Luzon, and launched by AES subsidiary Masin-AES Pte. Ltd during 2016. This storage generator provides 10 MW to the Luzon grid, and is the first battery based energy system in the country.

Based in Vietnam
 Mong Duong 2: Located in Cam Pha, this 1,240 MW coal fired plant became commercially operational in 2015. This plant, constructed under a Build-Operate Transfer (BOT) agreement between AES and state owned entities Electricity of Vietnam (EVN) and Vinacomin, is the largest power project in the nation's private sector.

Properties and subsidiaries in India
 OPGC Plant: Acquired by AES in 1998, this coal power plant has a total capacity of 420 MW. It is located in Odisha.
 OPGC II: Currently under construction, this coal powered plant is expected to boast 1,300 MW capacity.

References

External links
 

 
Electric power companies of the United States
Conglomerate companies of the United States
Companies based in Arlington County, Virginia
American companies established in 1981
Energy companies established in 1981
Non-renewable resource companies established in 1981
1981 establishments in Virginia
Companies listed on the New York Stock Exchange
Companies in the Dow Jones Utility Average